The Municipality of Luče is a municipality in northern Slovenia. It gets its name from the largest settlement and administrative seat of the municipality, Luče.

Settlements
In addition to the municipal seat of Luče, the municipality also includes the following settlements:
 Konjski Vrh
 Krnica
 Podveža
 Podvolovljek
 Raduha
 Strmec

References

External links

Municipality of Luče on Geopedia
Luče municipal site

 
Luce